Roger Federer was the defending champion, but chose not to participate this year.

Fernando Verdasco won in the final 7–5, 6–3 against Jo-Wilfried Tsonga.

In an exhibition tournament played apart from the main draw, Bernard Tomic defeated World No. 3 Novak Djokovic in three sets (6–4, 3–6, 7–5).

Players

Draw

Main draw

Play-offs

References

External links
Official AAMI Classic website
Past Results

Kooyong Classic
Aami Classic
AAMI